The Huastecan languages of Mexico are the most divergent branch of the Mayan language family.
They are Wastek (Huastec) and Chikomuseltek (Chicomuceltec).

Wastek (also spelled Huastec and Huaxtec) is spoken in the Mexican states of Veracruz and San Luis Potosí by around 110,000 people. It is the most divergent of modern Mayan languages. Chicomuceltec was a language related to Wastek and spoken in Chiapas that became extinct some time before 1982.

References

Mayan languages